Rhizamoeba is a small genus of free-living  marine naked lobose amoebae in the monotypic family Rhizamoebidae in the order Leptomyxida. It is most closely related to Leptomyxa and Flabellula, and some species have been moved to Leptomyxa due to molecular data.

Morphology
Members of Rhizamoeba are characterized by their morphology when they move, which is usually monopodial (with a single ramification), alternating between a slug-like shape and a fan shape. They have either one nucleus or multiple (less than 50) nuclei.

Classification
The paraphyly of the genus caused the transfer of two previously rhizamoeban species into Leptomyxa: R. australiensis and R. neglecta. As a result, only 3 species are currently confirmed as Rhizamoeba:
 Rhizamoeba saxonica 
 Rhizamoeba polyura 
 Rhizamoeba matisi 
Other possible species are not yet confirmed due to lack of published data or poor documentation. Some of these are: R. schnepfii  (considered nomen dubium since it has not been deposited to any culture collection), Trichamoeba caerulea  and Trichamoeba clava  (both transferred to Rhizamoeba in 1980 but poorly documented), Amoeba clavarioides  (identified as R. clavarioides through light microscopy), Polychaos timidum  (identified as R. timidum through light microscopy), etc.

References

Amoebozoa genera
Tubulinea